Joe is an unincorporated community south-southwest of Hot Springs, in Madison County, North Carolina, United States. The community is a part of the Asheville Metropolitan Statistical Area.

A post office called Joe was established in 1894, and remained in operation until 1953. Joe was the name of a female first settler.

References

Unincorporated communities in North Carolina
Asheville metropolitan area
Unincorporated communities in Madison County, North Carolina